The Diocese of Alexandretta is a titular Christian bishopric centred on the town of Alexandretta in Turkey. It is also known as Alexandrinus or Cambysopolis. The bishopric of Alexandria Minor was a suffragan of Anazarbus, the capital and so also the ecclesiastical metropolis of the Roman province of Cilicia Secunda. No longer a residential diocese, Alexandria Minor is today listed by the Catholic Church as a titular see.

List of known bishops
 Saint Helenus, 3rd century.
 Aristio, martyr saint
 Theodore, martyr
 Hesychius, who took part in the First Council of Nicaea in 325 and in the Synod of Antioch (341) 
 Philomusus participated in the First Council of Constantinople in 381. 
 Baranes is mentioned in connection with the Synod of Antioch (445). 
 Julianus fl 451
 Basilius was at the Synod of Constantinople (459).
 Paulus, deposed by Justinian fl518.
 Łukasz Krzysztof Wielewiejski (11 Sep 1726 – 1743) 
 Franz Dominikus von Almesloe (28 Jan 1743 – 1 Mar 1760) 
 Józef Michał Ignacy Franciszek Olędzki (24 Jan 1763–1803) 
 Thomas Walsh (28 Jan 1825 – 18 Feb 1849) 
 Ildefonse-René Dordillon, SS.CC. (7 Dec 1855  – 11 Jan 1888) 
 Wilhelmus Antonius Ferdinand Wulfingh, C.SS.R. (30 Jul 1889 – 5 Apr 1906) 
 Joseph Butt (16 Jan 1911 – 23 Apr) 
 Mathurin-Pie Le Ruyet, O.F.M. Cap. † (16 Jul 1938 Appointed – 9 Jun 1961 Died) 
 Daniel Tavares Baeta Neves (1 Jun 1962 – 4 Jun 1964) 
Elias (Youssef) of Aleppo and Alexandretta  (1971–2000)
 Paul (Yazigi) of Aleppo and Alexandretta (Greek-Orthodox, 2000- current)  Currently taken by ISIS fighters.

References

Catholic titular sees in Asia
Cilicia